The Order of Nunavut is a civilian honour for merit in the Canadian territory of Nunavut. Instituted in 2010 it is the highest honour which can be bestowed by the Government of Nunavut. It is intended to honour current and former residents of the territory (or the territory which became Nunavut).

Creation and history
The Order was created by the passage of the Order of Nunavut Act in late 2009. The award is modelled on the orders of the Canadian provinces. Inductees are entitled to use the postnominal letters ONu.

Eligibility and advisory committee
A maximum of three individuals may be inducted by the commissioner of Nunavut each year. An advisory committee consisting of the Speaker of the Legislative Assembly of Nunavut, the Senior Judge of the Nunavut Court of Justice and the President of Nunavut Tunngavik Incorporated. Like other provincial orders active politicians and judges cannot be appointed to the order while in office.  Like the National Order of Quebec the award is presented in the territory's Parliament. Although the Commissioner of the territory bestows the award, he or she is also automatically a member of the order ex-officio.

Members
The following is a list of members of the order:

Chancellors/Commissioners
 Ann Meekitjuk Hanson (2010)
 Edna Elias (2010)
 Nellie Kusugak (2015)
 Eva Aariak (2021)

2011
 Michael Gardener
 Mark Kalluak
 Jose Amaujaq Kusugak

2012
 Kenojuak Ashevak
 Charlie Panigoniak

2013
 Jimmy Akavak
 Louis Angalik Sr.
 Davidee Arnakak

2014
 John Amagoalik

2015
 Tagak Curley
 Bill Lyall
 Robert Lechat

2016
 Louie Kamookak
 Ellen Hamilton
 Red Pedersen

2017
 Betty Brewster
 Ludy Pudluk

2018
 Zacharias Kunuk

2019
 Peter Tapatai

2021
 Maryanne Inuaraq Tattuinee
 Dorothy Atuat Tootoo

References

External links
Official website
Order of Nunvut Act

Provincial and territorial orders of Canada
Culture of Nunavut
Awards established in 2011
2011 establishments in Canada